Göztepe is a neighborhood of İzmir, situated on the southern shore of the Gulf of İzmir, administratively within the boundaries of the metropolitan district of Konak. The neighborhood is also one of the eight quays of İzmir's urban ferry services operated by İzdeniz.

It is notable for its football club Göztepe S.K.

In Ottoman times, the alternative Greek name for Göztepe was "Enopi" and the area was a rich suburb inhabited principally by richer Greeks of İzmir.

Neighborhoods of Konak